Nuacht TG4 (Irish for TG4 News) is a daily half-hour Irish TV news programme. It is broadcast on weekday evenings at 7pm, live from the studios of TG4 in Baile na hAbhann, County Galway. A shortened edition of the programme is broadcast on weekend evenings at around 6:45pm.

Format and presenters
The programme is anchored by Siún Nic Gearailt and Eimear Ní Chonaola with Eibhlín Ní Choistealbha, Áine Lally, Máire Ní Mhadaoin, Ruairí Mac Con Iomaire and Maolra Mac Donnchadha occasionally substituting.

Nuacht TG4 also broadcasts a weekly programme called Timpeall na Tíre, which is a review of the week's top stories from Nuacht TG4.

TG4 provides an overnight international news service in the form of a simulcast of the English-language version of French public news station France 24.

Nuacht TG4 programme has an average viewership of 35–40,000.

Since 2010, Nóiméad Nuachta (News Minute) has broadcast each week day at 1:55pm.

History
Nuacht TnaG initially was broadcast at 22:00 each night, later moving to 20:00 and finally to 19:00 where it currently remains. From 1996 to 1998 Gráinne Seoige was the main news anchor for the channel, in 1998 she moved to TV3 to launch their main evening news where she remained until 2004. In 1998, Ailbhe Ó Monachain became TG4's main news anchor. With the rebranding of TnaG as TG4 the news service also renamed as Nuacht TG4. In 2006, Eimear Ní Chonaola became TG4's main news anchor.

External links
 http://www.tg4.ie/stud/nuac/nuac.asp
 RTÉ News
 Nuacht RTÉ

Irish-language television shows
Irish television news shows
RTÉ News and Current Affairs
TG4 original programming